Schedorhinotermes is a South-East Asian and Australasian genus of termites in the family Rhinotermitidae.

Species 
The Termite Catalogue lists the following Schedorhinotermes species:

 Schedorhinotermes actuosus
 Schedorhinotermes bidentatus
 Schedorhinotermes brachyceps
 Schedorhinotermes breinli
 Schedorhinotermes brevialatus
 Schedorhinotermes butteli
 Schedorhinotermes derosus
 Schedorhinotermes eleanorae
 Schedorhinotermes fortignathus
 Schedorhinotermes ganlanbaensis
 Schedorhinotermes holmgreni
 Schedorhinotermes insolitus
 Schedorhinotermes intermedius
 Schedorhinotermes lamanianus
 Schedorhinotermes leopoldi
 Schedorhinotermes longirostris
 Schedorhinotermes magnus
 Schedorhinotermes makassarensis
 Schedorhinotermes makilingensis
 Schedorhinotermes malaccensis
 Schedorhinotermes medioobscurus
 Schedorhinotermes nancowriensis
 Schedorhinotermes putorius
 Schedorhinotermes pyricephalus
 Schedorhinotermes rectangularis
 Schedorhinotermes reticulatus
 Schedorhinotermes robustior
 Schedorhinotermes sanctaecrucis
 Schedorhinotermes seclusus
 Schedorhinotermes solomonensis
 Schedorhinotermes tenuis
 Schedorhinotermes tiwarii
 Schedorhinotermes translucens
 Schedorhinotermes umbraticus

See also 
 Dagazvirus schedorhinotermitis

References

External links 
 
 

Insects of Asia
Insects of Australia
Rhinotermitidae